Nair Filipe Pires de Almeida (born January 23, 1984 in Lobito, Benguela province), is a retired Angolan handball player. Almeida began her career in a small handball team called Escola de Andebol da Restinga, do Lobito (EARL). She competed at the 2004 Summer Olympics in Athens and at the 2005 World Championship. At the 2007 World Championship Angola finished 7th, while Almeida scored 57 goals and was number six on the list of top scorers. She played for Angola at the 2008 Summer Olympics in Beijing and at the 2012 Summer Olympics in London.

References

External links
 

1984 births
Living people
People from Benguela Province
Angolan female handball players
Olympic handball players of Angola
Handball players at the 2004 Summer Olympics
Handball players at the 2008 Summer Olympics
Handball players at the 2012 Summer Olympics
African Games gold medalists for Angola
African Games medalists in handball
Competitors at the 2011 All-Africa Games